Farma — Padne kosa na kámen (or only Farma, "The Farm") is the Czech version of the reality TV series The Farm based on the Swedish TV series of the same name. The show filmed in June–August 2012 and premiered on 24 June 2012 on Nova.

Format
Twelve contestants are cut out from outside world. Each week one contestant is selected the Farmer of the Week. In the first week, the productions choose the Farmer. Since week 2, the Farmer is chosen by the contestant evicted in the previous week.

Nomination process
The Farmer of the Week nominates two people (a man and a woman) as the Butlers. The others must decide, which Butler is the first to go to the Battle. That person than choose the second person (from the same sex) for the Battle and also the type of battle (a quiz, tug-of-war, cutting wood). The Battle winner must win one duel. The Battle loser is evicted from the game.  In the live final 26 August 2012 Michal Páleník won 1 000 000 Kč . Šárka Havrlíková finish on the second place.

Contestants 
(ages stated are at time of contest)

Nominations

Week 5: Michaela quit, Jakub lost duel but stayed on the Farm. 
Week 7: Libuše accepted 100 000  Kč and quit. Because there were not 2 woman, Miroslav was automatically nominated.  
Jana K. was mad about Libuše leaving, so she quit the Farm. Jakub return to the farm. 
Week 8: Farmers broke rules. Losing back to the farm of one former farmer.

Choice to evict - Day 60

Vote on the first finalist - Day 60

External links
http://farma.tv

Television series by Endemol
The Farm (franchise)
2012 Czech television series debuts
2012 Czech television series endings
Czech reality television series
TV Nova (Czech TV channel) original programming
Czech television series based on non-Czech television series